Martha Jane Cannary (May 1, 1852 – August 1, 1903), better known as Calamity Jane, was an American frontierswoman, sharpshooter, and storyteller. In addition to many exploits she was known for being an acquaintance of Wild Bill Hickok. Late in her life, she appeared in Buffalo Bill's Wild West show and at the 1901 Pan-American Exposition. She is said to have exhibited compassion to others, especially to the sick and needy. This facet of her character contrasted with her daredevil ways and helped to make her a noted frontier figure. She was also known for her habit of wearing men's attire.

Early life 

Much of the information about the early years of Calamity Jane's life comes from an autobiographical booklet that she dictated in 1896, written for publicity purposes. It was intended to help attract audiences to a tour she was about to begin, in which she appeared in dime museums around the United States. Some of the information in the pamphlet is exaggerated or even completely inaccurate.

Calamity Jane was born on May 1, 1852, as Martha Jane Canary (or Cannary) in Princeton, within Mercer County, Missouri. Her father Robert Wilson Cannary had a gambling problem, and little is known about her mother Charlotte M. Cannary. Jane was the eldest of six children, with two brothers and three sisters.

In 1865, the family moved by wagon train from Missouri to Virginia City, Montana. In 1866, Charlotte died of pneumonia along the way, in Blackfoot, Montana. After arriving in Virginia City in the spring of 1866, Robert took his six children on to Salt Lake City, Utah. The family had been in Salt Lake City for only a year when he died in 1867. At age 14, Martha Jane took charge of her five younger siblings, loaded up their wagon once more, and took the family to Fort Bridger, Wyoming Territory, where they arrived in May 1868. From there, they traveled on the Union Pacific Railroad to Piedmont, Wyoming.

In Piedmont, Jane took whatever jobs she could find to provide for her large family. She worked as a dishwasher, cook, waitress, dance hall girl, nurse, and ox team driver. Finally, in 1874, she claimed she found work as a scout at Fort Russell. During that time, she also began her on-and-off employment as a prostitute at the Fort Laramie Three-Mile Hog Ranch. She moved on to a rougher, mostly outdoor and adventurous life on the Great Plains.

Acquiring the nickname 

Jane was involved in several campaigns in the long-running military conflicts with Native Americans. Her claim was that:

"Captain Jack" Crawford served under Generals Wesley Merritt and George Crook. According to the Montana Anaconda Standard of April 19, 1904, he stated that Calamity Jane "never saw service in any capacity under either General Crook or General Miles. She never saw a lynching and never was in an Indian fight. She was simply a notorious character, dissolute and devilish, but possessed a generous streak which made her popular."

A popular belief is that she instead acquired it as a result of her warnings to men that to offend her was to "court calamity". It is possible that "Jane" was not part of her name until the nickname was coined for her. It is certain, however, that she was known by that nickname by 1876, because the arrival of the Hickok wagon train was reported in Deadwood's newspaper, the Black Hills Pioneer, on July 15, 1876, with the headline: "Calamity Jane has arrived!"

Another account in her autobiographical pamphlet is that her detachment was ordered to the Big Horn River under General Crook in 1875. She swam the Platte River and travelled  at top speed while wet and cold in order to deliver important dispatches. She became ill afterwards and spent a few weeks recuperating. She then rode to Fort Laramie in Wyoming and joined a wagon train headed north in July 1876. The second part of her story is verified. She was at Fort Laramie in July 1876, and she did join a wagon train that included Wild Bill Hickok. That was where she first met Hickok, contrary to her later claims, and that was how she happened to come to Deadwood.

Deadwood and Wild Bill Hickok 
Calamity Jane accompanied the Newton–Jenney Party into Rapid City in 1875, along with California Joe and Valentine McGillycuddy. In 1876, Calamity Jane settled in the area of Deadwood, South Dakota, in the Black Hills. There she became friends with Dora DuFran, the Black Hills' leading madam, and was occasionally employed by her.

McCormick claim 
On September 6, 1941, the U.S. Department of Public Welfare granted old age assistance to a Jean Hickok Burkhardt McCormick who claimed to be the legal offspring of Martha Jane Cannary and James Butler Hickok. She presented evidence that Calamity Jane and Wild Bill had married at Benson's Landing, Montana Territory (now Livingston, Montana) on September 25, 1873. The documentation was written in a Bible and presumably signed by two ministers and numerous witnesses. However, McCormick's claim has been vigorously challenged because of a variety of discrepancies.

McCormick later published a book with letters purported to be from Calamity Jane to her daughter. In them, Calamity Jane says she had been married to Hickok and that Hickok was the father of McCormick, who was born September25, 1873, and was placed for adoption with a Captain Jim O'Neil and his wife. During this period, Calamity Jane was allegedly working as a scout for the army, and at the time of Hickok's death, he had recently married Agnes Lake Thatcher.

Calamity Jane does seem to have had two or four daughters, although the father's identity is unknown. In the late 1880s, Jane returned to Deadwood with a child who she said was her daughter. At Jane's request, a benefit was held in one of the theaters to raise money for her daughter's education in St. Martin's Academy at Sturgis, South Dakota, a nearby Catholic boarding school. The benefit raised a large sum; Jane got drunk and spent a considerable portion of the money that same night and left with the child the next day.

Estelline Bennett was living in Deadwood at that time and had spoken briefly with Jane a few days before the benefit. She thought that Jane honestly wanted her daughter to have an education and that the drunken binge was just an example of her inability to curb her impulses and carry through long-range plans (which Bennett saw as typical of Jane's class). Bennett later heard that Jane's daughter did "get an education, and grew up and married well".

After the death of Wild Bill Hickok 
Jane also claimed that, following Hickok's death, she went after his murderer Jack McCall with a meat cleaver, since she had left her guns at her residence. Following McCall's execution for the crime, Jane continued living in the Deadwood area for some time, and at one point she helped save numerous passengers in an overland stagecoach by diverting several Plains Indians who were in pursuit of the vehicle. Stagecoach driver John Slaughter was killed during the pursuit, and Jane took over the reins and drove the stage on to its destination at Deadwood.

In late 1876 or 1878, Jane nursed the victims of a smallpox epidemic in the Deadwood area.

Final years 

In 1881, Jane bought a ranch west of Miles City, Montana, along the Yellowstone River, where she kept an inn. According to one version of her life, she later married Clinton Burke from Texas and moved to Boulder, where she once again made an attempt in the inn business.

In 1893, Calamity Jane started to appear in Buffalo Bill's Wild West show as a storyteller. She also participated in the 1901 Pan-American Exposition.

Her addiction to liquor was evident even in her younger years.

Death
Jane returned to the Black Hills in the spring (April/May) of 1903, where brothel owner Madame Dora DuFran was still running her business. For the next few months, Jane earned her keep by cooking and doing the laundry for Dora's girls in Belle Fourche. In late July, Jane traveled by ore train to Terry, South Dakota, a small mining village near Deadwood. It was reported that she had been drinking heavily while on board the train and had fallen ill. The conductor, S. G. Tillett, carried her off the train, a bartender secured a room for her at the Calloway Hotel, and a physician was summoned. Jane's condition deteriorated quickly, and she died at the hotel on Saturday, August 1, 1903, from inflammation of the bowels and pneumonia.

A bundle of unsent letters to her daughter was allegedly found among Jane's few belongings. Composer Libby Larsen set some of these letters to music in an art song cycle called Songs From Letters (1989). The letters were first made public by Jean McCormick as part of her claim to be the daughter of Jane and Hickok, but their authenticity is not accepted by some, largely because  there is ample evidence that Jane was functionally illiterate.

Calamity Jane was buried at Mount Moriah Cemetery, South Dakota, next to Bill Hickok. Four of the men who planned her funeral later stated that Hickok had "absolutely no use" for Jane while he was alive, so they decided to play a posthumous joke on him by burying her by his side. Another account states: "in compliance with Jane's dying requests, the Society of Black Hills Pioneers took charge of her funeral and burial in Mount Moriah Cemetery beside Wild Bill. Not just old friends, but the morbidly curious and many who would not have acknowledged Calamity Jane when she was alive, overflowed the First Methodist Church for the funeral services on August 4 and followed the hearse up the steep winding road to Deadwood’s boot hill".

Major media representations

Films 
The Plainsman is a 1936 film starring Gary Cooper as Bill Hickok and Jean Arthur as Jane. In Young Bill Hickok with Roy Rogers (1940), she was played by Sally Payne. She was played by Marin Sais in the 1940 serial Deadwood Dick, by Frances Farmer in the 1941 Western The Badlands of Dakota, and by Jane Russell in the 1948 Bob Hope comedy The Paleface. In 1949's Calamity Jane and Sam Bass, Jane was played by Yvonne De Carlo and Sam Bass by Howard Duff; both characters were heavily fictionalized.

Calamity Jane is a 1953 musical-Western film from Warner Bros. starring Doris Day and Howard Keel as Wild Bill Hickok. The plot of the film is almost entirely fictional and bears little resemblance to the actual lives of the protagonists. It won the Best Song Oscar for "Secret Love", by Sammy Fain and Paul Francis Webster.

In 1961, in a Season 4 episode of Have Gun, Will Travel (The Cure), she is portrayed by Norma Crane. Among the liberties taken with the truth was changing her surname to Conroy.

In the 1984 made-for-TV film Calamity Jane, she was played by Jane Alexander. In the 1995 Disney movie Tall Tale: The Unbelievable Adventures of Pecos Bill, she was portrayed by Catherine O'Hara as a mythic figure, acquainted with Paul Bunyan and John Henry, and as Pecos Bill's jilted sweetheart and as a sheriff or deputy of some sort.

In the 1995 film Wild Bill, Calamity Jane was portrayed by Ellen Barkin, and in 1995 in Buffalo Girls by Anjelica Huston. In the 2009 French movie Lucky Luke, Jane was portrayed by Sylvie Testud.

Calamity Jane: Wild West Legend, a docu-fiction directed by Gregory Monro and released in 2014, inspired French writer and editor Rémi Chayé to create the feature-length animated movie, Calamity, a Childhood of Martha Jane Cannary. The film was released in France in 2020 and won the Annecy International Animated Film Festival’s Cristal Award for Best Feature in June 2020. Its American premiere took place on the opening night of the 2021 virtual Animation First Festival presented by French Institute Alliance Française.

Robin Weigert played Jane for three seasons in the HBO series Deadwood and in the HBO movie Deadwood: The Movie, released in May 2019.

Documentaries 
Calamity Jane: Wild West Legend directed by Gregory Monro in 2014

Games 
She appears as a side character in the computer RPG Worlds of Ultima: Martian Dreams (1991). In the KingsIsle Entertainment game Pirate101, Calamity Jane is one of the Magnificent 7. A character named after Calamity Jane appeared as a side character in the videogame Wild Arms (1996).

In the RPG Fallout 3, the Lone Wanderer references Calamity Jane in a dialogue option when first talking to Megaton sheriff and mayor, Lucas Simms. A character named Calamity Janet appears in the card board game BANG! Calamity: The Natural World, a line of educational games made in the 1990s for the PlayStation by Lightspan Adventures, stars Calamity Jane. In the first-person shooter Hunt: Showdown, she died during a Wild West show from a mysterious accident. Also, there is a legendary rifle named after her.

Plays 
Calamity Jane (A musical Western), an adaptation of the 1953 Doris Day film with additional songs, premiered in May 1961.

Productions: Calamity Jane: The Play by Catherine Ann Jones: Empire State Theatre, Albany, New York; Promenade Theatre, New York, NY, with Estelle Parsons; Santa Paula Theatre, Santa Paula, CA; Wimberley Players, Wimberley, Texas; Plaza Playhouse, Carpenteria, CA. Calamity Jane the Musical by Catherine Ann Jones: South Jersey Regional Theatre, Somers Point, New Jersey; Ojai Arts Theatre, Ojai, CA; Camino Real Theatre, San Juan Capistrano, CA; One Eyed Man Productions, a touring production (2017–18), Various Cities, Australia, with Virginia Gay.

Literature

Books 
Calamity Jane was an important fictional character in the Deadwood Dick series of dime novels, beginning with the first appearance of Deadwood Dick in Beadle's Half-Dime Library issue #1 in 1877. This series, written by Edward Wheeler, established her with a reputation as a Wild West heroine and probably did more to enhance her familiarity to the public than any of her real life exploits. There is no evidence that she was consulted by Wheeler or approved the Deadwood Dick stories, so the character in the stories was entirely fictitious—as were the events described—but the fictional adventures were muddled in the public mind with the real Jane.) Calamity Jane was the title character in a serial published in New York's Street & Smith's Weekly (1882) under the title, Calamity Jane: Queen of the Plains, by the author "Reckless Ralph".

The science fiction writer A. Bertram Chandler included a character named Calamity Jane Arlen in his far future novels set on the frontier Rim Worlds, a space analogue of the Old West.

A fictitious fight between Calamity Jane and an impostor is depicted in Thomas Berger's novel Little Big Man (1964). Jane is the central character in Larry McMurtry's book Buffalo Girls: A Novel (1990). Jane is a central character in Pete Dexter's novel Deadwood (1986).

J. T. Edson features Calamity Jane as a character in a number of his books, as a stand-alone character (in Cold Deck, Hot Lead, Calamity Spells Trouble, Trouble Trail, The Bull Whip Breed, The Cow Thieves, The Whip And The War Lance and The Big Hunt) and as a romantic interest of the character Mark Counter (in The Wildcats, The Bad Bunch, Guns In The Night and others).

An alternative universe version of Jane is a character in the short story "Deadwood" in Corsets and Clockwork (2011), a steampunk anthology. The story also features Jesse James. In Calamity's Wake (2013), a novel of historical fiction written by Natalee Caple, Martha, or Calamity Jane, is one of two main narrators; the other is Jane's daughter Miette. Calamity Jane, légende de l'Ouest, written by Gregory Monro (2010), is the only French biography to this day. Calamity Jane appears in Michael Crichton's novel Dragon Teeth (2017).

Comics 
Calamity Jane figures as a main character in an album of the same name of the Franco-Belgian comics series Lucky Luke, created by Morris and René Goscinny. Also, she features in the album Ghosthunt, created by Morris and Lo Hartog van Banda.

Music 
Calamity Jane and Wild Bill Hickok are featured in the song "Deadwood Mountain" by the country duo Big & Rich. Some of her purported letters were set to music in an art-song cycle by 20th-century composer Libby Larsen, called "Songs From Letters". Soprano Dora Ohrenstein commissioned five pieces compiled under the title Urban Diva, the second piece, Ben Johnston's Calamity Jane to Her Daughter is a theatrical setting of selected letters. "Calamity Jane" is a song by Grant-Lee Phillips on "Virginia Creeper" (2004). "Calamity Jane" is a song by Kiya Heartwood on Wishing Chair's Underdog CD (2005).

Alain Bashung, Chloé Mons, Rodolphe Burger released the album La Ballade de Calamity Jane (2006) based on Jane's letters to her daughter. "Kalamity Jane" is a song by Czech rock band Kabát. "Calamity Jane" is a song by Chris Anderson on his album "The Crown" (2004). The 1953 movie "Calamity Jane" with Doris Day and Howard Keel features the song, "My Secret Love" which won the 1954 Academy Award for "Best Music Original Song". Calamity Jane is mentioned in the 2016 song "The Lighter" by the French pop-rock band Superbus, from the album "Sixtape".

Television 
The long-running series Biography featured Calamity Jane. The episode is available on the Biography website.

The name "Calamity" is given to the children's character played by Nancy Gilbert in the 1955–1956 syndicated television series, Buffalo Bill, Jr., with Dick Jones as the fictitious Buffalo Bill, Jr., and Harry Cheshire as Judge Ben "Fair and Square" Wiley.

In the episode "Calamity" (December 13, 1959) of the ABC/Warner Brothers western series, Colt .45, Dody Heath is cast as Calamity Jane and Joan Taylor as a woman doctor, Ellen McGraw. In the story line, series character Christopher Colt, played by Wayde Preston, hires Calamity Jane to drive the stagecoach containing Dr. McGraw and the vaccine needed for the smallpox outbreak in Deadwood. Colt is unsure if Calamity can handle the job because miners and Indians seek to steal the valuable medication.

In an episode of Bonanza, "Calamity Over the Comstock" (1963), Stefanie Powers plays Calamity Jane, who visits Virginia City along with Doc Holliday. In this primarily comedic episode, she is rescued by Little Joe, who at first thinks she is a male. She becomes infatuated with him, and he receives threats from Doc, who covets Jane for himself. At her urging (and threat), Doc demurs from facing down Joe, and Jane and Doc exit town. No official or unofficial documentation exists suggesting that Doc Holliday and Jane ever met during their lifetimes. It is highly unlikely that they met considering the geographical distances between them during their lives.

In an episode of the television show Death Valley Days, "A Calamity Named Jane", Fay Spain plays Calamity Jane as she joins Wild Bill Hickok's (Rhodes Reasons) show. Her uncouth behavior causes Bill to think he made a mistake, and when Bill tells her she should "act like a lady" he soon realizes he made a bigger mistake.

In the 1966 Batman series, one of the villains in season three was named "Calamity Jan" (played by Dina Merrill).

The television movie Calamity Jane (1984) featured her life story, including her alleged marriage to Wild Bill Hickok and the daughter she purportedly gave up. Actress Jane Alexander portrayed Calamity and was nominated for an Emmy in 1985 for Outstanding Lead Actress in a Limited Series or Special. The show also featured an early performance of Sara Gilbert as Calamity's daughter, Jean, at age 7.

Jane is the central character in Larry McMurtry's book Buffalo Girls: A Novel (1990), and in the 1995 TV adaptation of the same name, Jane is played by Anjelica Huston, with Sam Elliott as Wild Bill Hickok.

In 1997, a cartoon series on Kids' WB, The Legend of Calamity Jane, depicted a young Jane (voiced by Barbara Weber Scaff).

Robin Weigert played Calamity Jane in the HBO series Deadwood (2004–2006) and in the HBO sequel Deadwood: The Movie (2019).

Movies 

In the movie “Our Brand is Crisis” (2015), the leading character is named “Calamity” Jane Bodine.

See also 

List of female explorers and travelers
Calamity Jane at Biography.com

Notes

References

Bibliography 
 *

External links 

 
 
 
 

1852 births
1903 deaths
19th-century American women
20th-century American women
American female military personnel
American explorers
American folklore
American frontier
American prostitutes
Gunslingers of the American Old West
Sharpshooters
Wild West show performers
Deaths from pneumonia in South Dakota
People from Deadwood, South Dakota
People from El Paso, Texas
People from Madison County, Montana
People from Princeton, Missouri
People from Uinta County, Wyoming
People of the Klondike Gold Rush
People from Jefferson County, Montana
Alcohol-related deaths in South Dakota
Nicknames